Russell Stephen Drago (November 5, 1928 – December 5, 1997) was an American professor of inorganic chemistry.  He mentored more than 130 PhD students, authored over a dozen textbooks and four hundred research documents, which have been published in several languages. He filed 17 process patents. and established the Florida Catalysis Conference Foundation, Inc.

Personal life 
Russell S. Drago was born November 5, 1928, in Montague, Massachusetts to Stephen R. Drago and Lillia Mary Margret (Pucci) Drago.

In 1950, Drago married Ruth Ann Burrill (January 29, 1929 – November 9, 2013). They remained married for 47 years until his death. They had four children, Patti Kouba (Drago), Steve, Paul, and Robert.

Career
In June, 1950, Drago graduated with a BS degree in Chemistry from the University of Massachusetts Amherst. After he completed his time with the U.S. Air Force, he enrolled at Ohio State University under the GI bill, completing his Ph.D. degree on December 17, 1954, under Professor Harry Sisler. His thesis was entitled "Studies on the Synthesis of Chloramine and Hydrazine."

In 1955, he was hired at the University of Illinois at Urbana–Champaign Department of Chemistry, where he remained until 1982. In 1966, he published the textbook Physical Methods in Inorganic Chemistry.  In 1982, he moved to the University of Florida as Graduate Research Professor of Chemistry.

Chemistry lineage
Drago (Ohio St, 1954) < Sisler (Illinois, 1939) < Audrieth (Cornell, 1926) < Browne (Cornell, 1903) < Dennis (Michigan, 1886) < Hempel (Heidelberg, 1873)	<	Robert Bunsen (Göttingen, 1830) < Friedrich Stromeyer (Göttingen, 1800) < Louis Nicolas Vauquelin (Paris, 1790) < Antoine François, comte de Fourcroy (Paris, 1780) < Jean Baptiste Michel Bucquet (Paris 1770) and Antoine Lavoisier (Paris, 1764)

Contributions
Drago's research covered both the theoretical and practical side of acid-base chemistry. He developed the E and C equation as a quantitative model for acid-base reactions. His group used a variety of physical methods to probe intermolecular interactions and helped pioneer NMR studies of paramagnetic systems. He contributed to the area of catalysis focusing primarily on chemical processes relevant to industrial applications.  Work in this field contributed significantly to the understanding of ligand – metal and metal – metal interactions and their influence on the mechanisms, activity, and selectivity of numerous transition metals catalyzed systems.

A video interview with Drago is available.

Accomplishments
1966: published Physical Methods in Inorganic Chemistry
1966: published Prerequisites for College Chemistry
1969: won the ACS Award in Inorganic Chemistry
1970: co-authored Acids and Bases with N A Matwiyoff
1970: co-authored Core Experiments in General Chemistry with T L Brown
1971: published Qualitative Concepts from Quantum Chemistry
1973: awarded the Guggenheim Fellowship for Chemistry
1974: published Principles of Chemistry with Practical Perspectives
1979: published General Chemistry Problem Solving I
1986: established the Florida Catalysis Conference Foundation, Inc.
1994: published Applications of Electrostatic-Covalent Models in Chemistry
Professor Drago established the Drago Distinguished Professor position at the University of Florida, and an annual Drago Chemistry Award at Ithaca College.

PhD theses supervised
1958 – C. Shumulbach; 
1959 – J. Chandler; 
1960 – B. Karstetter, R. Ragsdale, N. Rose; 
1961 – R. Latham, D. Straub, D. Wenz; 
1962 – R. Carlson, M. Joesten, D. Meek, J. Wuller; 
1963 – J. Donoghue, R. Longhi, D. Lydy, N. Matwiyoff, R. Niedzielski; 
1964 – D. Eyman, V Meek, L. Sacks, G. Shier, B. Wayland; 
1965 – R. Middaugh, V. Mode, K. Purcell, M. Rosenthal, K. Whitten; 
1966 – T. Bolles, D. Herlocker, P. Van der Voom; 
1967 – F. Henneike, H. Petersen, M. Rettig, M. Wicholas; 
1968 – D. Dugre, T. Epley, R. Fitzgerald, J. Hill, D. Rowley, S. Zumdahl; 
1969 – S. Anderson, D. Brown, R. Cramer; 
1970 – E. Baucom, R. DeSimone, W. Perry, G. Vogel, J. Zink; 
1971 – Y. Lim, T. Maier, R. Strange; 
1972 – R. Chiang, E. Johnson, T. Needham, F. Slejko; 
1973 – N. Kildahl, D. McMillin, A. Marks; 
1974 – J. Elias, R. Guidry, N. O’Bryan, A. Pribula; 
1975 – T. Beugelsdijk, B. Tovrog; 
1976 – M. Hoselton, Marinda Li Wu, D. Kitko, R. Richman; 
1977 – J. Breese, T. Kuechler; 
1978 – C. Chamberlain, J. Gaul; 
1979 – B. Bunker, P. Cannady. A. El A’mma; 
1980 – M. Desmond, K. Leslie, J. Long; 
1981 – M. Kroeger, A. Zombeck;
1982 – B. Corden, E. Nyberg; 
1984 – D. Oester, J. Telser; 
1985 – D. Hamilton, J. Miller, D. Pribich, J. Stahlbush, E. Stine; 
1986 – K. Balkus, C.Bilgrien, K. Weiss, A. Zuzich; 
1987 – J. Clark, R. Cosmano, P. Doan, C. Owens; 
1988 – S. Davis, C. Getty, E. Getty; 
1989 – M. Barnes, G. Grunwald, R. Riley, R. Taylor; 
1990 – T. Cundari, N. Wong; 
1991 – A. Goldstein; 
1992 – S. Petrosius, S. Showalter; 
1993 – M. Naughton, D. Patton; 
1994 – C. Chronister, D. Ferris, J. Hage; 
1995 – T. Lafrenz, M. Robbins; 
1996 – N. Kob; 
1997 – J. Dias, S. Dias, K. Lo, J. McGilvray;
1998 – M. Gonzalez, S. Joerg, W. Kassel, A. Mateus; 
1999 – K. Frank, B. Gordon, D. Ortillo, J. Osegovic, B. Scott, C. Webster, C. Xu.

Visiting professors and post-doctorals

R. Beer
I. Bertini 
R. Bhattacharyya
R. Birdwhistel
I. Bresisnka
J. Bright
D. Burns 
P. Bustamante  
G. Dahlen
J. George
C. Grunwald 
D. Hart
K. Jurzyk 
P. Kaufman 
E. Kwiatkowska 
D. Kovala-Demertzi
A. Newman
M. Nozari
J. Nusz
W. Partenheimer
J. Ramsden
D. Reichgott
M. Rudolf
J. Sales
Bassam Shakhashiri 
G. Shul’pin
D. Singh
P. Tanner 
M.Torreabla 
I. Walker
W. White 
L. Wilson 
You Xiao-Zeng 
Y. Zub

References

1928 births
1997 deaths
20th-century American chemists
Inorganic chemists
University of Florida faculty
People from Montague, Massachusetts